May the Best House Win is a British lifestyle show that aired on ITV from 22 February 2010 to 24 June 2013 and was narrated by Guy Porritt. The show sees four proud homeowners compete to win £1,000 by showing off their homes to the other contestants, who will then rate their home based on their interior design, homeliness, comfort, and hospitality. Since 2014, repeats of the show had been airing on ITVBe

Show overview
The programme consists of four homeowners each preparing their houses in their own unique style to impress the other three contestants, who rate the interior design, homeliness, comfort, and hospitality all in a bid to win £1,000. The show is often compared with other daytime shows Come Dine with Me and House Gift.

Adaption 
An adaption of this show was Mein Zuhause, Dein Zuhause – Wer wohnt am schönsten? on kabel eins in Germany in 2013.

The American version of the show is called May the Best House Win USA and it airs it on TLC.

Criticism
The show has been criticized for being too much like Channel 4's Come Dine with Me, mainly in Harry Hill's TV Burp. Sian Brewis on Leicester Mercury described May The Best House Win as a Come Dine With Me, for houses.  Lorraine Gibson of the Bournemouth Echo also noted the similarity predicting that the show would, like Come Dine With Me, eventually be transferred to the evening schedules.  UKGameshows.com said "It's not such a bad programme really, but the likeness to Come Dine with Me is hard to ignore, and makes the programme feel quite derivative".

Transmissions

May the Best House Win

May the Best House Win Abroad

Specials

References

External links

2010s British game shows
2010 British television series debuts
2013 British television series endings
ITV game shows
ITV (TV network) original programming
Television series by ITV Studios